Aleksandrów Kujawski  (until 1879: Trojanów, 1879–1919: Aleksandrów Pograniczny) is a town in north-central Poland, in Kuyavian-Pomeranian Voivodeship. It is the seat of Aleksandrów County, as well as of Gmina Aleksandrów Kujawski (although it is not part of the territory of that gmina).

History

The Trojanów train station, which was established in the course of the construction of the railway line from Kutno to Toruń between 1859 and 1865, was the nucleus of the town, which was founded in 1862. Equally important was its location near the border of the Russian Empire (Congress Poland/Russian Partition) with the Kingdom of Prussia (Prussian Partition, later also the German Empire). In 1879, a meeting between the Russian Emperor Alexander II and the German Emperor William I took place here. On this occasion, the place was renamed Aleksandrowo and received municipal rights. It was later renamed Aleksandrów Pograniczny ("Aleksandrów on the border").

The town received its current name in 1919 after Poland was restored as an independent state. In the years 1921–1923 there was an internment camp for soldiers of the Ukrainian People's Republic in Aleksandrów Kujawski. In 1932, Aleksandrów Kujawski became the seat of the Nieszawa county, which on April 1, 1938, became part of the Pomeranian Voivodeship in the Second Polish Republic.

During the German occupation of Poland, between October 1939 and January 1940 Germans murdered many Poles from the town in the nearby Odolion forest (see Nazi crimes against the Polish nation). In October 1939, Germans arrested five Salesians from the town, and in 1940 they expelled 735 Poles, whose houses, workshops and offices were then handed over to German colonists as part of the Lebensraum policy.

Between 1975 and 1998 the town was a part of Włocławek Voivodeship.

Transport

Road transport
Voivodeship road 266 (Konin–Ciechocinek) directly passes through the town.

Rail transport
Railway lines 18 and 245 pass through the town. The town has a railway station.

Municipal parts
 Centrum
 Osiedle Parkowa I
 Osiedle Parkowa II
 Piaski (Piachy)
 Halinowo
 Osiedle Południe

See also

 Aleksandrów Kujawski railway station
 Stadion Miejski (Aleksandrów Kujawski)

References

External links

  
 Jewish community of Aleksandrów Kujawski on Virtual Shtetl

Aleksandrów County
Cities and towns in Kuyavian-Pomeranian Voivodeship
Pomeranian Voivodeship (1919–1939)
Warsaw Governorate
Warsaw Voivodeship (1919–1939)